The mixed team 25 meter standard pistol event at the 2019 European Games in Minsk, Belarus took place on 28 June at the Shooting Centre.

Schedule
All times are  local (UTC+3).

Results

Qualification

Semifinal

Final

References

Mixed team 25 metre standard pistol